The 2019 General Aung San Shield is the fifth season of Myanmar knockout football competition. The tournament is organized by the Myanmar Football Federation. It is the league cup competition started in 2019 Myanmar football season. This cup succeeded the Myanmar Football Federation Cup.

Results

Preliminary round
Preliminary round consists of two rounds for teams currently playing in the Regional League Division 1 level. The First round was held 13 March 2019.

First round

Second round

Quarter-final

Semi-final

First leg

Second leg

Final

Top goalscorers

Sponsor

Official Main Sponsor
 Myanmar Brewery Ltd

Official Partner
 AYA Bank

Media Broadcasting
 MWD

FB Partner
 My Sports

Co-sponsor
 100plus
 AYA Myanmar Insurance
 M-150
 Canon
 FBT
 Genius Sports
 JCB Card
 Molten
 Z-Tech Solution

References

External links
General Aung San Shield Facebook page

General Aung San Shield
2019 in Burmese football
Myanmar